The Blacksburg Museum and Cultural Foundation is a cultural institution in the Town of Blacksburg, Virginia, that sponsors exhibits, concerts, lecture series, and other cultural activities. The museum is headquartered in the Alexander Black House. The BM&CF also consists of the St. Luke & Odd Fellows Hall, a museum of African-American heritage in Blacksburg.

History and progress

In 1798, the Town of Blacksburg was laid out in a 16-square grid, which covered a  land plot bordered on four sides by Jackson, Draper, Clay and Wharton Streets. Many of the blocks now have different businesses located there, but a committee has been established to promote community awareness about the historical significance of many different locations downtown, especially the Alexander Black House.

Mission
The mission of the Blacksburg Museum and Cultural Foundation is to preserve, interpret and promote Blacksburg's art, history and cultural heritage.

References

External links
 Alexander Black House & Cultural Center - official site
 Blacksburg Museum and Cultural Foundation - items, collections, exhibits

Buildings and structures in Blacksburg, Virginia
Museums in Montgomery County, Virginia
Proposed museums in the United States
History museums in Virginia
African-American museums in Virginia